Located in National City, California, southeast of San Diego, the Mile of Cars Association is an automotive association in the United States. The mile-long stretch of National City Boulevard comprises 21 new car franchises. It was first established in 1904 when the city's first car dealership opened and took its name in 1955.  By 1970, more than one million dollars in vehicles were sold.

External links
Official Web Site
Clasp Automotive

Auto rows
National City, California
Organizations based in San Diego County, California
Organizations established in 1954
1954 establishments in California